Jakarta International Equestrian Park or JIEP is an equestrian sport venue located at Kayu Putih, Pulo Gadung, East Jakarta, Indonesia. After renovation, the arena was inaugurated on 2 August 2018. This arena was used as a venue for 2018 Asian Games. It has land area of 35-hectares with a main four-story pavilion of 1500 seating capacity, two-storied 156 capacity horse stables, athletes lodging, an animal hospital, and training places.

The park is disable friendly, which has secured international certification from World Organization for Animal Health (OIE) in Paris and from the European Union. After 2018 Asian Games JIEP will also be used for other events, such as a venue for conferences, weddings or even music concerts and art exhibitions.

References

Equestrian venues in Indonesia
Sports venues in Jakarta
East Jakarta
Post-independence architecture of Indonesia
2018 Asian Games
Venues of the 2018 Asian Games
Asian Games equestrian venues